Reddyanus brachycentrus is a species of scorpion in the family Buthidae.

References

Animals described in 1899
brachycentrus
Taxa named by R. I. Pocock